Arcangelo de' Bianchi (4 October 1516 – 18 January 1580) was an Italian Roman Catholic cardinal and bishop.

Life and church
Arcangelo de' Bianchi was born in Gambolò, a village near Vigevano in the Piedmont, the son of Luigi Bianchi and Santina Panizzari. He was from a well-to-do family.  At a young age, he entered the Dominican Order at Vigevano. He studied at the Monastery of San Domenico in Bologna, receiving a doctorate in Christian theology in 1527. After he was ordained as a priest in the Order of Preachers, he was assigned by his superiors to accompany Fra Michele Ghislieri, the future Pope Pius V, in many of his missions as an inquisitor. In 1559, Arcangelo became prior of Santa Maria delle Grazie, the famous Dominican convent in Milan. He became a Commissary of the Roman Inquisition in 1564, just as his patron Cardinal Ghislieri had in 1551.  Pius IV made the appointment, in fact, on the recommendation of Cardinal Ghislieri, who had become one of the six cardinals of the Holy Inquisition.

On 16 September 1566 he was appointed Bishop of Teano by his friend Michele Ghislieri, who had been elected Pope Pius V earlier in that year. He was consecrated as a bishop in the Sistine Chapel by Scipione Rebiba, titular Latin Patriarch of Constantinople (1565–1573) on 21 September 1566 with Giulio Antonio Santorio, Archbishop of Santa Severina, and Carlo Grassi, Bishop of Corneto (Tarquinia) e Montefiascone, serving as co-consecrators.  Arcangelo Bianchi was Bishop of Teano until September 1575.  He resigned the government of his diocese sometime before 18 September 1575.

Pope Pius V made him a cardinal priest in the consistory of 17 May 1570. He received the red hat and the titular church of San Cesareo in Palatio on 3 July 1570. The pope named Cardinal de' Bianchi his confessor, as he had been earlier when they were travelling companions. He was present at the pope's death and heard his last confession.

He participated in the papal conclave of 1572 that elected Pope Gregory XIII. The new pope made him Prefect of the Index Librorum Prohibitorum. He died in Rome, at the age of sixty-four. He was buried in the Dominican church of Santa Sabina on the Aventine Hill. While bishop, he was the principal consecrator of Baldassarre Giustiniani, Bishop of Venosa (1572).

References

1516 births
1580 deaths
Bishops appointed by Pope Pius IV
16th-century Italian cardinals
Cardinals created by Pope Pius V
Dominican bishops
Dominican cardinals
16th-century Italian Roman Catholic bishops